Silke Schwarz is a German wheelchair fencer.

Schwarz competed at the 1996 Paralympics, where she won a gold medal in the individual foil A event, a silver medal in the épée team and a bronze medal in the foil team event, and at the 2000 Paralympics, where she won silver medals in the individual épée A and épée team events and a bronze medal in the foil team event.

References

Year of birth missing (living people)
Living people
German female fencers
Paralympic wheelchair fencers of Germany
Paralympic gold medalists for Germany
Paralympic silver medalists for Germany
Paralympic bronze medalists for Germany
 Wheelchair fencers at the 1996 Summer Paralympics
 Wheelchair fencers at the 2000 Summer Paralympics
Medalists at the 1996 Summer Paralympics
Medalists at the 2000 Summer Paralympics
Paralympic medalists in wheelchair fencing
German disabled sportspeople